Glauber is a small lunar impact crater that is located just to the north of the large walled plain Mendeleev, on the Moon's far side. This crater lies just outside the irregular rim of Mendeleev, but well within the outer skirt of ejecta. It is a circular crater with a rim that has not been significantly eroded. The simple inner walls slope down to a small floor at the midpoint with a peak at the center. The diameter of the floor is only about one-third that of the crater.

References
 

 
 
 
 
 
 
 
 
 
 
 
 

Impact craters on the Moon